Darko Kostić (Belgrade, 1980) is a famous Serbian fashion designer. His fall/winter 2014 collection of silver and steel grey dresses was premiered in photos in an underground parking lot. In 2018, he was accused of a sexually assaulting a 15-year-old boy in his apartment and arrested afterwards.

References

1980 births
Living people
Fashion designers from Belgrade